SendThisFile is a file transfer service operated by SendThisFile, Inc., which uses cloud computing and 128-bit TLS encryption to enable users to securely send and receive large data files through the Internet. The company was co-founded in 2003 by CEO Aaron Freeman and his father CFO Michael Freeman.
SendThisFile has around 1.5 million users and has transferred over 40 million files.

The service is an alternative to e-mailing large e-mail attachments and in 2016 received recognition in the press as one of the best services available to do so.

See also
Cloud storage
Comparison of file hosting services
DropSend
Pando (application)
WeTransfer

References

External links
 

Email attachment replacements
One-click hosting
Software companies based in Kansas
Networking companies of the United States
Software companies of the United States